We Bare Bears is an American animated television series on Cartoon Network. Created by Daniel Chong and directed by Manny Hernandez, it follows the adventures of three adopted anthropomorphic bears, Grizzly, Panda, and Ice Bear (voiced respectively by Eric Edelstein, Bobby Moynihan, and Demetri Martin), as they navigate life among humans in San Francisco.

The first six episodes of the series were aired during the final week of July 2015, starting on July 27. The network renewed the series for a second season in August 2015. The first season ended on February 11, 2016, and the second season premiered on February 25, 2016. The series was renewed for a third season in October 2016 which premiered on April 3, 2017, and the second season ended a week later on April 11, 2017; the second and third-season episodes alternated between each other for the first two weeks of April. On March 8, 2018, the series was renewed for a fourth and final season.

Series overview

Episodes

Pilot (2014)
A pilot for the series was produced by Cartoon Network Studios and was released in 2014 at the KLIK! Animation Festival in Amsterdam. Following its release, it received the festival's "Young Amsterdam Audience" award. The pilot was aired over a year later, on Cartoon Network's feed for the United Kingdom and Ireland.

Season 1 (2015–16)

Season 2 (2016–17)

Season 3 (2017–18)

Season 4 (2018–19)

Film (2020)
On May 30, 2019, Cartoon Network announced We Bare Bears: The Movie. On May 21, 2020, the movie was announced to release digitally on June 30, 2020, and premiered on Cartoon Network on September 7, 2020. The film was also leaked on Amazon on its intended DVD date, June 8, but was removed shortly after.

Shorts

Season 1

Season 2
All of these shorts below (along with "Goodnight Ice Bear") were shown after the initial broadcast of the Teen Titans Go! and The Powerpuff Girls (reboot) crossover special "TTG v PPG" and are part of the show's second season.

Season 3
These five shorts aired as part of the third season and aired together on TV on April 27, 2017. TV Guide and other sources say these shorts make an episode called "We Bare Bears Digital Shorts 3".

References

External links

Lists of Cartoon Network television series episodes
Lists of American children's animated television series episodes
2010s television-related lists
We Bare Bears